This is a list of plants found in the wild in cerrado vegetation of Brazil.

Acanthaceae
 Anisacanthus trilobus Lindau
 Dicliptera mucronifolia Nees
 Dicliptera sericea Nees 
 Geissomeria ciliata Rizzini
 Geissomeria dawsonii Leonard  
 Geissomeria longiflora Salzm. ex Nees  (= Geissomeria macrophylla Nees)
 Geissomeria schottiana Nees 
 Hygrophila costata Sinning 
 Justicia angustifolia Nees
 Justicia burchellii Hiern
 Justicia chrysotrichoma Pohl ex (Ness)
 Justicia cynea Leonard 
 Justicia genistiformis Nees
 Justicia irwinii Wassh. 
 Justicia lanstyakii Rizzini 
 Justicia nodicaulis Pohl ex Nees  
 Justicia phyllocalyx (Lindau) Wassh. & C.Ezcurra (= Sericographis macedoana Rizzini)
 Justicia pycnophylla Lindau
 Justicia riparia C.Kameyama (= Beloperone mollis Nees)  
 Justicia sarithroides Lindau 
 Justicia serrana C.Kameyama 
 Justicia tocantina Nees var. longispicus Rizzini (= Chaetothylax tocantinus, Justicia tocantinus) 
 Justicia umbrosa Benth.  
 Justicia warmingii Hiern 
 Lepidagathis alopecuroides R.Br. ex Griseb. 
 Lophostachys cyanea Leonard 
 Lophostachys falcata Nees 
 Lophostachys floribunda Pohl (= Lepidagathis floribunda (Pohl) C.Kameyama) 
 Lophostachys laxiflora Nees 
 Lophostachys montana Mart. ex Nees
 Lophostachys sessiliflora Pohl 
 Lophostachys villosa Pohl 
 Mendoncia puberula Nees 
 Mendoncia velloziana Nees 
 Mendoncia mollis Lindau 
 Poikilacanthus oncodes Lindau 
 Ruellia acutangula Nees ex Mart. 
 Ruellia angustifolia Sessé et Moc.  
 Ruellia angustior (Nees) Lindau  
 Ruellia asperula Benth. et Hook.f. 
 Ruellia brevicaulis Baker 
 Ruellia brevifolia (Pohl) C. Ezcurra
 Ruellia capitata D.Don 
 Ruellia (Scorodoxylum) costata (Nees) Hiern var. latifolium Nees 
 Ruellia (Scorodoxylum) costata (Nees) Hiern var. salicifolium Nees
 Ruellia densa Hiern 
 Ruellia diffusa Royle ex Nees 
 Ruellia dissitifolia Hiern. 
 Ruellia eriocalyx Glaz. 
 Ruellia eurycodon Lindau 
 Ruellia flava Roxb.
 Ruellia formosa Andrews 
 Ruellia geminiflora Kunth
 Ruellia glanduloso-punctata Lindau 
 Ruellia hapalotricha Lindau 
 Ruellia helianthemum (Nees) Lindau  
 Ruellia humilis Pohl ex Nees 
 Ruellia hypericoides Lindau 
 Ruellia incomta Lindau 
 Ruellia macrantha Mart. ex Nees
 Ruellia menthoides Hiern 
 Ruellia neesiana Lindau 
 Ruellia (Dipteracanthus) nitens (Nees) Wassh. 
 Ruellia (Dipteracanthus) pohlii Nees
 Ruellia puri Mart. ex Nees 
 Ruellia rasa Hiern 
 Ruellia rufipila Rizzini 
 Ruellia stenandrium Pohl ex Nees 
 Ruellia tomentosa Wall. 
 Ruellia trachyphylla Lindau 
 Ruellia trivialis Blanch. ex Nees 
 Ruellia verbasciformis Nees
 Ruellia villosa Lindau 
 Ruellia vindex Mart. ex Nees 
 Staurogyne elegans Kuntze 
 Staurogyne hirsuta Kuntze 
 Staurogyne minarum Kuntze 
 Stenandrium hirsutum Nees 
 Stenandrium pohlii Nees

Alismataceae
 Echinodorus bolivianus (Rusby) Holm-Niels.  
 Echinodorus grandiflorus (Cham. et Schltdl.) Micheli ssp. grandiflorus (=Echinodorus pubescens Seub. ex Warm.)
 Echinodorus grandiflorus (Cham. & Schltdl.) Micheli ssp. aureus (Fasset.) Haynes et Holm-Niels.
 Echinodorus grisebachii Small  
 Echinodorus guyanensis Griseb. (=Sagittaria guyanensis Kunth)  
 Echinodorus longipetalus Micheli
 Echinodorus macrophyllus (Kunth.) Micheli ssp. scaber (Rataj.) Hayne et Holm-Niels.
 Echinodorus martii Micheli  
 Echinodorus paniculatus Micheli  
 Echinodorus alatus (Mart.) Griseb. ssp. alatus  
 Echinodorus alatus (Mart.) Griseb. ssp. andrieuxii (Hook. & Arn.) Hayne & Holm-Niels.
 Echinodorus tenellus Buchen. (=Alisma tenellum Mart.)  
 Echinodorus tunicatus Small   
 Ottelia brasiliensis Walp.  
 Sagittaria guayanensis Kunth. ssp. guayanensis  
 Sagittaria lagoensis Seub. et Warm.  
 Sagittaria planitiana G.Agostini  
 Sagittaria rhombifolia Cham.

Alstroemeriaceae (Liliaceae)
 Alstroemeria brasiliensis Spreng.  
 Alstroemeria burchelii Baker  
 Alstroemeria caryophyllacea Jacq.  
 Alstroemeria cunea Vell.   
 Alstroemeria foliosa Mart.  
 Alstroemeria gardneri Baker   
 Alstroemeria plantaginea Mart.   
 Alstroemeria psittacina Lehm.    
 Alstroemeria pulchella L.f. 
 Alstroemeria scarlatina Ravenna  
 Alstroemeria stenocephala Schenk  
 Alstroemeria viridiflora Warm.  
 Alstroemeria zamioides Baker

Amaranthaceae

 Alternanthera brasiliana (L.) Kuntze     
 Alternanthera brasiliana (L.) O.Kuntze var. moquinii (Webb. ex Moq.) Uline    
 Alternanthera brasiliana (L.) O.Kuntze var. villosa (Moq.) O.Kuntze   
 Alternanthera martii (Moq.) R.E.Fries    
 Alternanthera tenella Collad.    
 Amaranthus flavus L.  
 Amaranthus paniculatus Walf. (=Amaranthus caudatus L.)
 Chamissoa acuminata Mart.  
 Chamissoa altissima Kunth  
 Chamissoa maximiliani Mart. ex Moq. 
 Froelichiella grisea (Lopr.) R.E.Fr.   
 Gomphrena agrestis Mart.    
 Gomphrena aphylla Pohl ex Moq. (=Gomphrena equisetiformis R.E.Fr.)     
 Gomphrena celosioides Mart.   
 Gomphrena claussenii Moq.   
 Gomphrena decipiens Seub.   
 Gomphrena desertorum Mart.    
 Gomphrena glabrata Moq. (=Pfaffia glabrata Mart.)  
 Gomphrena globosa L. 
 Gomphrena graminea Moq.    
 Gomphrena hermogenesii J.C. de Siqueira  
 Gomphrena lanigera Pohl ex Moq. (=Gomphrena scapigera Mart. var. lanigera (Pohl ex Moq.) Stuchlik)
 Gomphrena macrorhisa Mart. 
 Gomphrena matogrossensis Suesseng.   
 Gomphrena moquini Seub.  
 Gomphrena officinalis Mart. (=G. arborescens L.f., or G. macrocephala A.St.-Hil.)    
 Gomphrena pohlii Moq.    
 Gomphrena prostrata Mart.    
 Gomphrena rudis Moq.  
 Gomphrena scapigera Mart.   
 Gomphrena vaga Mart.   
 Gomphrena velutina Moq. 
 Gomphrena virgata Mart.    
 Pfaffia cinera (Moq.) O.Kuntze 
 Pfaffia denutata (Moq.) O.Kuntze    
 Pfaffia glomerata (Spreng.) Pedersen    
 Pfaffia gnaphaloides (L. f.) Mart.  
 Pfaffia helichrysoides (Moq.) O.Kuntze    
 Pfaffia jubata Mart. (=Gomphrena jubata Moq.)    
 Pfaffia paniculata (Mart.) Kuntze 
 Pfaffia sericantha (Mart.) T.M.Pedersen  
 Pfaffia sericea (Spreng.) Mart.  
 Pfaffia townsendii Pedersen    
 Pfaffia tuberosa (Spreng.) Hick.   
 Pfaffia velutina Mart.    
 Xerosiphon aphyllus (Pohl ex Moq.) Pedersen

Amaryllidaceae (Liliaceae)
 Amaryllis heringerii Ravenna  
 Crinum virgineum Mart.   
 Griffinia liboriana Lem.  
 Hippeastrum aulicum (Ker Gawl.) Herb.    
 Hippeastrum calyptratum Herb. (=Amaryllis unguiculata Mart.)  
 Hippeastrum gayanum Kuntze  
 Hippeastrum goianum Ravenna (=Amaryllis goiana Ravenna)   
 Hippeastrum psittacinum Herb. (=Amaryllis psittacina Ker Gawl.)   
 Hippeastrum puniceum (Lam.) Kuntze  
 Hippeastrum solandriferum Herb.
 Zephyranthes franciscana Herb. ex Baker, Zephyranthes robusta Herb.

Anacardiaceae

 Anacardium corymbosum B. Rod.
 Anacardium humile A.St.-Hil.
 Anacardium nanum A.St.-Hil.
 Anacardium occidentale L. (=Anacardium curatellifolium A.St.-Hil.)  
 Anacardium othonianum Rizzini   
 Astronium fraxinifolium Schott
 Astronium gracile Engl.  
 Astronium graveolens Jacq. 
 Astronium nelson-rosae Santin 
 Astronium ulei Mattick   
 Lithraea molleoides (Vell.) Engl.   
 Myracrodruon urundeuva M.Allemão (=Astronium urundeuva Engl.)   
 Schinus terebinthifolius Raddi
 Schinus terebinthifolius Raddi var. pohlianus Engl.
 Spondias mombin L.  
 Spondias purpurea L.  
 Tapirira guianensis Aubl.
 Tapirira marchandii Engl.
 Tapirira obtusa (Benth.) J.D.Mitchell

Annonaceae

 Annona cacans Warm.
 Annona campestris R.E.Fr.
 Annona coriacea Mart.
 Annona cornifolia A.St.-Hil.  
 Annona crassiflora Mart. 
 Annona crotonifolia Mart. 
 Annona dioica A.St.-Hil.
 Annona malmeana R.E.Fr.
 Annona montana Macfad.
 Annona monticola Mart. 
 Annona muricata L.
 Annona pygmaea W.Bartram 
 Annona reticulata L.
 Annona tomentosa R.E.Fr.
 Bocageopsis mattogrosensis R.E.Fr.
Cardiopetalum calophyllum Schltdl.
 Duguetia echinophora R.E.Fr.
 Duguetia furfuracea (A.St.-Hil.) Benth. & Hook. 
 Duguetia lanceolata A.St.-Hil. 
 Duguetia marcgraviana Mart. 
 Ephedranthus parviflorus S.Moore 
 Guatteria ferruginea A.St.-Hil. 
 Guatteria nigrescens Mart. 
 Guatteria parvifolia R.E.Fr. 
 Guatteria pohliana Schltdl. ex Mart. 
 Guatteria rupestris Mello-Silva et Pirani
 Guatteria sellowiana Schltdl. 
 Guatteria silvatica R.E.Fr. 
 Guatteria villosissima A.St.-Hil. 
 Oxandra reticulata Maas 
 Rollinia emarginata Schltdl.
 Rollinia deliciosa DC.
 Rollinia dolabripetala A.St.-Hil.
 Rollinia laurifolia Schltdl. 
 Rollinia mucosa Baill. 
 Rollinia sericea R.E.Fr.
 Rollinia sylvatica (A.St.-Hil.) Mart. 
 Unonopsis guatterioides (DC.) R.E.Fr.
 Unonopsis lindmanii R.E.Fr. 
 Uvaria macrocarpa Warm. 
 Xylopia aromatica (Lam.) Mart.
 Xylopia brasiliensis Spreng.
 Xylopia emarginata Mart. 
 Xylopia frutescens Aubl. 
 Xylopia grandiflora A.St.-Hil. 
 Xylopia sericea A.St.-Hil.

Apocynaceae
 Allamanda angustifolia Pohl 
 Allamanda puberula var. glabrata Müll.Arg. 
 Aspidosperma cylindrocarpon Müll.Arg.  
 Aspidosperma dasycarpon A.DC.
 Aspidosperma macrocarpon Mart.
 Aspidosperma parvifolium A.DC.
 Aspidosperma subincanum Mart.
 Aspidosperma tomentosum Mart.
 Hancornia speciosa Gomes
 Himatanthus obovatus (Müll.Arg.) Woodson

Aquifoliaceae

 Ilex brasiliensis (Spreng.) Loes. 
 Ilex cerasifolia Reissek   
 Ilex conocarpa Reissek
 Ilex paraguariensis A.St.-Hil.

Araliaceae
 Didymopanax macrocarpum (Cham. et Schltdl.) Seem.
 Didymopanax morototoni (Aubl.) Decne. 
 Didymopanax vinosum Marchal

Arecaceae
 Acrocomia aculeata (Jacq.) Lodd. ex Mart.  
 Attalea geraensis Barb. Rodr.
 Butia leiospatha (Barb. Rodr.) Becc.
 Butia paraguayensis (Barb. Rodr.) L.H.Bailey
 Mauritia flexuosa L.f.   
 Mauritia vinifera Mart.

Asteraceae
 Achyrocline satureioides (Lam.) DC. 
 Adenosthema viscosum Forst.
 Aspilia latissima Malme 
 Baccharis dracunculifolia DC.  
 Baccharis trimera DC. 
 Bidens gardneri Baker 
 Eremanthus goyazensis Sch. Bip.
 Eremanthus mattogrossensis Kuntze
 Eremanthus sphaerocephalus (DC.) Baker   
 Piptocarpha rotundifolia (Less.) Baker
 Vanillosmopsis erythropappa (DC.) Sch. Bip.
 Vanillosmopsis polycephala (DC.) Sch. Bip.
 Vernonia brasiliana (L.) Druce  
 Vernonia ferruginea Less  
 Vernonia florida Gardner  
 Vernonia polyanthes (Spreng.) Less 
 Vernonia rubriramea Mart. ex DC. 
 Vernonia ruficoma Schltdl.

Balanophoraceae
 Helosis Helosis brasiliensis Schott et Endl. 
 Langsdorffia hypogea Mart.

Begoniaceae
 Begonia cucullata Ruiz ex A.DC.
 Begonia fischeri Otto et A.Dietr. 
 Begonia leptophylla Taub. 
 Begonia lobata Schott

Bignoniaceae
 Anemopaegma arvense (Vell.) Stellf. ex Souza
 Anemopaegma chamberlaynii var. tenerius Lam.
 Anemopaegma glaucum Mart. ex DC.
 Anphilophium aff. paniculatum  (L.) Kunth
 Arrabidaea brachypoda (DC.) Bureau et K. Schum.
 Arrabidaea florida DC.
 Arrabidaea pulchra Bureau
 Cybistax antisyphillitica Mart.
 Handroanthus albus
 Jacaranda brasiliana Pers.
 Jacaranda caroba (Vell.) DC.
 Jacaranda decurrens Cham.  
 Jacaranda rufa Silva Manso  
 Tabebuia aurea Benth. et Hook.f. ex S.Moore  
 Tabebuia avellanedae Lorentz ex Griseb.  
 Tabebuia caraiba (Mart.) Bureau 
 Tabebuia ochracea (Cham.) Standl. 
 Tabebuia roseo-alba (Ridl.) Sandw.  
 Tabebuia serratifolia (Vahl) Nichols.
 Zeyhera digitalis (Vell.) Hoehne
 Zeyhera montana Mart. 
 Zeyhera tuberculosa (Vell.) Bureau

Bixaceae
 Cochlospermum regium (Mart.) Pilg.

Bombacaceae
 Bombax campestre (Mart. et Zucc.) K. Schum.
 Bombax gracilipes K. Schum.
 Bombax pubescens Mart. et Zucc.
 Eriotheca gracilipes (K. Schum.) A. Robyns
 Eriotheca pubescens (Mart. et Zucc.) A. Robyns
 Pseudobombax grandiflorum (Cav.) A. Robyns
 Pseudobombax longiflorum (Mart. et Zucc.) A. Robyns

Boraginaceae
 Cordia sellowiana Cham.  
 Cordia trichotoma (Vell.) Arráb. ex Steud.

Bromeliaceae
 Aechmea distichantha Lem.
 Ananas ananassoides (Baker) L.B.Smith
 Bromelia balansae Mez

Burseraceae
 Protium almecega March.
 Protium heptaphyllum (Aubl.) March.
 Protium widgrenii Engl.

Caesalpinioideae
 Acosmium  dasycarpum (Vogel) Yak.
 Acosmium subelegans (Molembr.) Yak.
 Apuleia leiocarpa (Vogel) Macbr.
 Bauhinia bongardi Steud. 
 Bauhinia forficata Link
 Bauhinia holophylla Steud.  
 Bauhinia rufa Steud. 
 Chamaecrista campestris (Benth.) Irwin et Barneby  
 Chamaecrista cathartica (Mart.) Irwin et Barneby  
 Chamaecrista desvauxii (Collad.) Killip. var. glauca (Harsl) Irwin et Barneby  
 Chamaecrista desvauxii (Collad.) Killip. var. langsdorffii (Kunth ex Vogel) Irwin et Barneby  
 Chamaecrista desvauxii (Collad.) Killip. var. mollissima (Benth) Irwin et Barneby  
 Chamaecrista flexuosa (L.) Greene
 Chamaecrista setosa (Vogel) Irwin et Barneby  
 Copaifera elliptica Mart.
 Copaifera langsdorffii Desf.
 Copaifera oblongifolia Mart.
 Copaifera officinalis Vell.
 Dimorphandra exaltata Schott 
 Dimorphandra mollis Benth.
 Diptychandra aurantiaca (Mart.) Tul.  
 Diptychandra glabra Benth.  
 Hymenaea stigonocarpa Mart.
 Sclerolobium aureum (Tul.) Benth.  
 Sclerolobium paniculatum Vogel
 Senna bicapsularis L.  
 Senna macranthera (Colladon) lrwin et Barneby 
 Senna rugosa (G.Don) Irwin et Barneby 
 Senna sylvestris (Vell.) Irwin et Barneby var. bifaria Irwin & Barneby

Caryocaraceae
 Caryocar brasiliense Cambess.

Celastraceae
 Austroplenckia populnea (Reissek ex Mart.) Lundell

Clethraceae
 Clethra brasiliensis Cham. et Schltdl.
 Clethra scabra Pers.

Clusiaceae
 Kielmeyera coriacea Mart. & Zucc.

Combretaceae
 Terminalia argentea Mart. et Zucc.
 Terminalia brasiliensis (Chambess.) Eichler
 Terminalia fagifolia Mart. et Zucc.

Connaraceae
 Connarus cf. regnelli Schel  
 Connarus suberosus Planch.

Dilleniaceae
 Curatella americana L.

Ebenaceae
 Diospyros hispida DC.
 Diospyros sericea DC.

Erythroxylaceae

 Erythroxylum ambiguum A.St.-Hil.  
 Erythroxylum campestre A.St.-Hil. 
 Erythroxylum cuneifolium (Mart.) O.E.Schulz  
 Erythroxylum deciduum A.St.-Hil. 
 Erythroxylum pelleterianum A.St.-Hil.  
 Erythroxylum suberosum A.St.-Hil.  
 Erythroxylum tortuosum Mart.

Euphorbiaceae
 Actinostemon conceptionis (Chodat & Hassler) Pax.
 Alchornea triplinervia (Spreng.) Müll.Arg.
 Croton floribunduns Spreng.
 Croton lobatus L.
 Manihot caerulescens Pohl  
 Manihot tripartita Müll.Arg.  
 Pera glabrata (Schott) Baillon
 Pera obovata Baillon

Faboideae
 Aeschynomene selloi Vogel
 Amburana claudii (Fr.All.) A.C.Smith   
 Andira cf. anthelmia (Vell.) Macbr. 
 Andira laurifolia Benth.
 Andira humilis Mart. ex Benth.  
 Andira inermis (W.Wright) DC.
 Acosmium subelegans (Mohlenbr.) Yakovlev  
 Arachis pintoi Krapov. & W.C.Gregory
 Bowdichia virgilioides Kunth
 Camptosema ellipticum (Desv.) Burkart
 Centrosema pubescens Benth.   
 Dalbergia miscolobium Benth.   
 Dalbergia violaceae (Vogel) Malme
 Dipteryx alata Vogel
 Erythrina mulungu Mart.
 Machaerium aculeatum Raddi 
 Machaerium acutifolium Vogel
 Machaerium brasiliense Vogel  
 Machaerium nyctitans (Vell.) Benth.
 Machaerium opacum Vogel
 Machaerium scleroxylon Tull.
 Machaerium villosum Vogel
 Ormosia arborea (Vell.) Harms.
 Platypodium elegans Vogel
 Pterodon polygaeflorus Benth.  
 Pterodon pubescens Benth.

Flacourtiaceae
 Casearia arborea (Rich.) Urb.
 Casearia decandra Jacq. 
 Casearia grandiflora A.St.-Hil.
 Casearia lasiophylla Eichler  
 Casearia obliqua Spreng.  
 Casearia silvestris Schwartz

Guttiferae
 Calophyllum brasiliense Cambess.
 Kielmeyera coriacea (Spreng.) Mart.
 Kielmeyera rubriflora Cambess.  
 Kielmeyera variabilis (Spreng.) Mart.

Hippocrateaceae
 Salacia campestris Walp.  
 Salacia crassiflora (Mart.) Peyr.
 Salacia micrantha (Mart.) Peyr.

Icacinaceae
 Emmotum nitens (Benth.) Miers

Labiatae
 Hyptis cana Pohl ex Benth.
 Hyptis crinita Benth.

Lauraceae
 Aiouea trinervea Meisn.
 Nectandra cuspidata Ness et Mart. ex Nees  
 Nectandra lanceolata Nees  
 Ocotea acutifolia (Nees) Mez  
 Ocotea corymbosa Mez  
 Ocotea minarum Mart. ex Nees  
 Ocotea pulchella Mart.  
 Ocotea velutina Mart.
 Persea pyrifolia Nees et Mart.

Lecythidaceae
 Cariniana estrellensis (Raddi) Kuntze

Loganiaceae
 Antonia ovata Pohl
 Strychnos brasiliensis (Spreng.) Mart.
 Strychnos pseudoquina A.St.-Hil.

Lythraceae
 Lafoensia pacari A.St.-Hil. 
 Lafoensia replicata Pohl

Malpighiaceae
 Banisteriopsis adenopoda (A.Juss.) B.Gates  
 Banisteriopsis campestris (A.Juss.) Settle  
 Banisteriopsis pubipetala (A.Juss.) Cuatrec.  
 Byrsonima basiloba A.Juss.  
 Byrsonima coccolobifolia (Spreng.) Kunth
 Byrsonima coriacea (L.) Kunth 
 Byrsonima crassa Nied.
 Byrsonima crassifolia (L.) Kunth
 Byrsonima cydonaefolia A.Juss.  
 Byrsonima intermedia A.Juss.  
 Byrsonima subterranea Brade et Markgr.
 Byrsonima verbascifolia (L.) Rich. ex A.Juss.

Melastomataceae
 Acisanthera alsinaefolia  (DC.) Triana  
 Miconia albicans (Sw.) Triana
 Miconia candolleana Triana  
 Miconia chamissois Naud.  
 Miconia cinerascens Miq.  
 Miconia fallax DC.  
 Miconia langsdorffii Cogn.
 Miconia ligustroides (DC.) Naud.  
 Miconia macothyrsa Benth.
 Miconia minutiflora DC. 
 Miconia paulensis Naud.
 Miconia pepericarpa DC.
 Miconia pohliana Cogn.
 Miconia rubiginosa (Bonpl.) DC.  
 Miconia sellowiana Naud.  
 Miconia stenostachya DC.  
 Miconia theezans (Bom.) Cogn.

Meliaceae
 Cedrela fissilis Vell.  
 Cedrela odorata L.  
 Cabralea cangerana Sald.
 Cabralea polytricha Juss.
 Tapirira guianensis Aubl.
 Tapirira marchandii Engl.

Mimosaceae
 Acacia paniculata Willd.
 Acacia plumosa Lowe.
 Acacia polyphylla DC.
 Anadenanthera falcata (Benth.) Speg. 
 Anadenanthera macrocarpa (Benth.) Brenan 
 Calliandra macrocephala Benth.  
 Enterolobium gummiferum (Mart.) Macbride
 Mimosa acerba Benth.
 Mimosa chaetosphera Barn.  
 Mimosa debilis Humb. et Bonpl.    
 Mimosa laticifera Rizzini et N.F.Mattos
 Mimosa leptocaulis Benth. 
 Platymenia reticulata Benth.
 Stryphnodendron adstringens (Mart.) Coville
 Stryphnodendron obovatum Benth.  
 Stryphnodendron polyphyllum Benth.

Moraceae
 Brosimum gaudichaudii Trecul
 Cecropia pachystachia Trecul

Myrsinaceae
 Cybianthus detergens Mart.
 Myrsine ferruginea (Sw.) R. Br. ex Roem & Schult.  
 Myrsine umbellata Mart.
 Rapanea ferruginea (Ruiz et Pav.) Mez
 Rapanea guianensis (Aubl.) Kuntze
 Rapanea lancifolia (Mart.) Mez  
 Rapanea oblonga Pohl
 Rapanea umbellata (Mart.) Mez

Myrtaceae
 Calyptranthes clusiaefolia O.Berg  
 Calyptranthes lucida Mart. ex DC.  
 Campomanesia adamantium Blume  
 Campomanesia pubescens (DC.) O.Berg
 Campomanesia velutina (Cambess.) O.Berg  
 Eugenia aurata O.Berg  
 Eugenia bimarginata DC.  
 Eugenia blastantha (O.Berg) D.Legrand  
 Eugenia cerasiflora Miq.  
 Eugenia dysenterica DC.  
 Eugenia hiemalis Cambess.  
 Eugenia klotzschiana O.Berg  
 Eugenia kunthiana DC.  
 Eugenia livida O.Berg  
 Eugenia pitanga (O.Berg ex Mart.) Kiaersk.  
 Eugenia pluriflora Mart.  
 Eugenia punicifolia (Kunth) DC.  
 Eugenia racemulosa O.Berg  
 Eugenia uruguayensis Cambess.
 Myrcia albo-tomentosa DC.  
 Myrcia bella Cambess.  
 Myrcia castrensis (O.Berg) D.Legrand  
 Myrcia fallax DC.  
 Myrcia formosiana DC.  
 Myrcia guayavaefolia O.Berg  
 Myrcia laruotheana Cambess.  
 Myrcia lasiantha DC.  
 Myrcia lingua O.Berg. Mattos et D.Legrand 
 Myrcia multiflora (Lam.) DC.  
 Myrcia pallens DC.  
 Myrcia pruniflora DC.  
 Myrcia rostrata DC.  
 Myrcia sphaerocarpa DC.  
 Myrcia tomentosa DC.  
 Myrcia uberavensis O.Berg  
 Myrcia venulosa DC.  
 Myrciaria ciliolata O.Berg  
 Myrciaria delicatula O.Berg  
 Psidium australe Cambess.  
 Psidium cinereum Mart.
 Psidium incanescens Mart.

Myristicaceae
 Virola sebifera Aubl.

Nyctaginaceae
 Neea theifera Oerst.  
 Pisonia campestris Netto
 Pisonia tomentosa Casar.

Orchidaceae
 Epidendrum secundum Jacq.

Ochnaceae
 Ouratea castanaefolia Engl.
 Ouratea floribunda (A.St.-Hil.) Engl.  
 Ouratea nana (A.St.-Hil.) Engl.  
 Ouratea spectabilis (Mart.) Engl.

Opiliaceae
 Agonandra brasiliensis  Benth. et Hook.f.

Passifloraceae
 Passiflora kermesina Link & Otto (=Passiflora raddiana DC.)

Polygalaceae
 Bredemeyra floribunda Willd.

Proteaceae
 Roupala brasiliensis Klotzsch
 Roupala gardneri Meisn.
 Roupala heterophylla Pohl
 Roupala lucens Meisn. 
 Roupala montana Aubl.

Rubiaceae
 Alibertia concolor (Cham.) K.Schum. 
 Alibertia edulis (L.C. Rich.) A.C. Rich.  
 Alibertia macrophylla K.Schum.  
 Alibertia sessilis (Cham.) K.Schum.  
 Amaioua guianensis Aubl.  
 Borreria latifolia (Aubl.) K.Schum. var. latifolia f. fockeana (Miq.) Steyerm.  
 Rustia formosa (Cham. et Schltdl.) Klotzsch
 Tocoyema formosa (Cham. et Schltdl.) K.Schum.

Rutaceae
 Dictyoloma inanescens DC.
 Zanthoxylum hiemale A.St.-Hil. 
 Zanthoxylum rhoifolium Lam.

Sapindaceae
 Cupania zanthoxylloides Cam.
 Dilodendron bipinnatum Radlk.
 Magonia glabrata A.St.-Hil.
 Magonia pubescens A.St.-Hil.

Sapotaceae
 Chrysophyllum marginatum (Hook. et Arn.) Radlk.
 Pouteria ramiflora Radlk.
 Pouteria torta Radlk.

Solanaceae
 Cestrum lanceolatum Miers  
 Cestrum sendtnerianum Mart. ex Sendtn.  
 Solanum concinnum Schott ex Sendtn.  
 Solanum granuloso-leprosum Dunal  
 Solanum inaequale Vell.  
 Solanum lycocarpum A.St.-Hil.  
 Solanum paniculatum L.
 Solanum sisymbrifolium Lam.

Styracaceae
 Styrax camporum Pohl 
 Styrax ferrugineus Ness et Mart.
 Styrax martii Seub.
 Styrax pohlii A.DC.

Symplocaceae
 Symplocos celastrinea Mart. ex Miq.  
 Symplocos lanceolata (Mart.) A. DC.
 Symplocos nitens (Pohl) Benth.
 Symplocos platyphylla (Pohl) Benth. 
 Symplocos pubescens Klotzsch ex Benth.  
 Symplocos tenuifolia Brand. 
 Symplocos uniflora Benth.

Tiliaceae
 Apeiba tibourbou Aubl.
 Guazuma ulmifolia Lam.
 Luehea candicans Mart.  
 Luehea divaricata Mart.
 Luehea grandiflora Mart.
 Luehea paniculata Mart.
 Luehea rufescens A.St.-Hil.
 Luehea uniflora A.St.-Hil.

Verbenaceae
 Aegiphila lhotskiana Cham.
 Aegiphila sellowiana Cham.  
 Aegiphila tomentosa Cham.

Vochysiaceae
 Callisthene minor Mart.  
 Qualea cordata Spreng.
 Qualea dichotoma (Mart.) Warm.   
 Qualea glauca Warm.
 Qualea grandifloa Mart.
 Qualea multiflora Mart.
 Qualea parviflora Mart.
 Salvestia convallariodora A.St.-Hil.
 Vochysia cinnamomea Pohl 
 Vochysia discolor Warm.
 Vochysia elliptica Spreng. Mart.
 Vochysia rufa Spreng. Mart.
 Vochysia thyrsoidea Pohl
 Vochysia tucanorum (Spreng.) Mart.

See also

List of plants of the Amazon rainforest of Brazil
List of plants of Atlantic Forest vegetation of Brazil
List of plants of Caatinga vegetation of Brazil
List of plants of Pantanal vegetation of Brazil
List of endangered flora of Brazil

References

  MENDONÇA, R. C.; FELFILI, J. M.; WALTER, B. M. T.; SILVA, M. C.; REZENDE, FILGUEIRAS, T. S.; NOGUEIRA, P. E. Flora vascular do bioma Cerrado (Vascular Flora of Cerrado Biome) Brazilian Institute of Geography and Statistics
   Brandão, Mitzi; Galvilanes, M. L.; (1992); Espécies árboreas padronizadoras do Cerrado mineiro e sua distribuição no Estado.; Informe Agropecuário 16 (173): 5-11. 
  Brandão, Mitzi; Carvalho, P. G. S.; Jesué, G.; (1992); CEMIG: Guia Ilustrado de Plantas do Cerrado.; Minas Gerais.  
 CASTRO, A. A. J. F., MARTINS F. R., TAMASHIRO, J. Y., SHEPHERD G. J. (1999). How rich is the flora of Brazilian Cerrados? Annals of the Missouri Botanical Garden 86 (1): 192-224.  
  Coutinho, Leopoldo Magno Cerrado; University of São Paulo, São Paulo state
  Gamarra-Rojas, Cíntia. (2005) Checklist das Plantas do Nordeste (Checklist of Plants of Northeast Brazil).
 G. Gottsberger, I. Silberbauer-Gottsberger:  Life in the Cerrado Reta Verlag, Ulm 2006,  Volume 1,  Volume 2
  LEITÃO FILHO, H.F. (1992). A flora arbórea dos Cerrados do Estado de São Paulo. Hoehnea 19 (1/2): 151-163. 
  Lorenzi, Harri (1992) Árvores Brasileiras (Brazilian Trees) Nova Odessa: Plantarum.
  Pereira, Benedito Alísio da Silva; Silva  Maria Aparecida da Lista de nomes populares de  plantas nativas da Região Geoeconômica de Brasília, DF. (List of vernacular names of natives plants of Brasília Geoeconomic Region) Brasília: RECOR Ecological Reserve of Brazilian Institute of Geography and Statistics.

External links

 01
Cerrado
Flora of Goiás
Flora of Minas Gerais
Environment of Goiás
Environment of Minas Gerais
Cerrado
Cerrado